Vernon is an unincorporated community in Braxton County, in the U.S. state of West Virginia.

History
A post office called Vernon was established in 1915, and remained in operation until 1940. The town name of Vernon was selected by a local child for unknown reasons.

References

Unincorporated communities in Braxton County, West Virginia
Unincorporated communities in West Virginia